Rapanea is a genus of plant in family Primulaceae. It has often been placed in synonymy with Myrsine, and many species have been moved to Myrsine. , Plants of the World Online does not accept the genus, regarding it as a synonym of Myrsine.

Species formerly placed in the genus include:
 Rapanea collina (Nadeaud) Mez, synonym of Myrsine collina
 Rapanea longifolia (Nadeaud) Mez, synonym of Myrsine longifolia - French Polynesia
 Rapanea mccomishii Sprague, synonym of Myrsine mccomishii - Lord Howe Island
 Rapanea melanophloeos (L.) Mez, synonym of Myrsine melanophloeos - Southern Africa
 Rapanea myrtillina Mez, synonym of Myrsine myrtillina - Lord Howe Island
 Rapanea perakensis (King & Gamble) B.C.Stone, synonym of Myrsine perakensis - Malaysia endemic 
 Rapanea platystigma (F.Muell.) Mez, synonym of Myrsine platystigma - Lord Howe Island
 Rapanea salicina (Hook.f.) Mez, synonym of Myrsine salicina
 Rapanea seychellarum Mez, synonym of Myrsine seychellarum - Seychelles endemic
 Rapanea striata Mez, synonym of Myrsine striata - India endemic
 Rapanea variabilis (R.Br.) Mez, synonym of Myrsine variabilis

References

External links

 
Primulaceae genera
Taxonomy articles created by Polbot